"Stand by Me" should not be confused with "Stand by Me Father", by Sam Cooke and J. W. Alexander.

Though sometimes known as "Stand by Me Father", "Stand by Me" is a 1905 gospel song by the Rev. Charles Albert Tindley. Although often thought to be a "traditional spiritual", Tindley copyrighted the song in 1905. The song of the same name by Ben E. King draws on Tindley's song. The song has been sung in Tindley's original gospel form by various artists including Bob Dylan.

Lyrics
When the storms of life are raging, stand by me. 
When the storms of life are raging, stand by me. 
When the world is tossing me, like a ship upon the sea, 
thou who rulest wind and water, stand by me. 

In the midst of tribulation, stand by me. 
In the midst of tribulation, stand by me. 
When the hosts of hell assail, and my strength begins to fail, 
thou who never lost a battle, stand by me. 

In the midst of faults and failures, stand by me. 
In the midst of faults and failures, stand by me. 
When I do the best I can, and my friends misunderstand, 
thou who knowest all about me, stand by me. 

In the midst of persecution, stand by me. 
In the midst of persecution, stand by me. 
When my foes in battle array, undertake to stop my way, 
thou who saved Paul and Silas, stand by me.

When I'm growing old and feeble, stand by me.
When I'm growing old and feeble, stand by me.
When my life becomes a burden, and I'm nearing chilly Jordan,
O thou Lily of the Valley, stand by me.

Recordings

The song has been recorded by artists including:

 1928: Pace Jubilee Singers (10" 78rpm single Victor 21551)
 1937: Norfolk Jubilee Singers (Decca Records)
 1941: Sister Rosetta Tharpe (Decca).  However, the lyrics do not match the hymn so it is a totally different song. 
 1949: Ernest Tubb (10" 78rpm single Decca 14506)
 1961: The Staple Singers (Vee Jay)
 1966: The Caravans (Exodus Records)
 1966: Elvis Presley (RCA Victor)
 1985: Canton Spirituals (J&B Records)
 2018: Sweet Yonder (Sweet Yonder) on the album Next to You
 (Date unknown) The Pilgrim Travelers. Re-issued on The Best of Gospel Choirs (1995, Baur Music Production BMP 51143)

References

1905 songs
American Christian hymns
Hymns by Charles Albert Tindley
Pace Jubilee Singers songs
Public domain music